Frankland may refer to:

People
 Edward Frankland (1825–1899), English chemist
 George Frankland (1800–1838), English surveyor and Surveyor-General of Van Diemen's Land (now Tasmania) 
 Henry Frankland (1690–1738), administrator of the English East India Company, President of Bengal
 Jocosa Frankland (1531–1587), English philanthropist
 Juliet Frankland (1929–2013), British mycologist
 Noble Frankland (1922–2019), British historian
 Percy F. Frankland (1858–1946), British chemist
 Richard Frankland (born 1963), Australian playwright, scriptwriter and musician
 Richard Frankland (1630–1698), English nonconformist, founder of the dissenting Rathmell Academy
 Rosemarie Frankland (1943–2000), Welsh beauty pageant contestant and actress
 Shan Frankland, fictional character
 Thomas Frankland (disambiguation), several people
 William Frankland (disambiguation), several people

Places
 Frankland, Western Australia
 Frankland Group National Park, Queensland, Australia
 Frankland Peak, mountain in South West Tasmania
 Frankland River (Western Australia)
 Frankland River (North West Tasmania)
 Frankland Range, Mountain range in South West Tasmania, Australia
 State of Frankland or State of Franklin, an unrecognized autonomous United States territory created in 1784
 Francia or Frankland, a European territory inhabited and ruled by the Franks from the 3rd to the 10th century

Other
 Frankland baronets The Frankland Baronetcy, of Thirkelby in the County of York, was created in 1660 and is extant.
 Frankland (HM Prison), a prison near Durham, England
 Howard Frankland Bridge, the central bridge spanning Old Tampa Bay from St. Petersburg, Florida to Tampa, Florida